JTBC (shortened from Joongang Tongyang Broadcasting Company (stylized as jtbc) is a South Korean nationwide pay television network. Its primary shareholder is JoongAng Holdings, with a 25% stake. It was launched on 1 December 2011. JTBC is a generalist channel, with programming consisting of television series, variety shows, and news broadcasting; its news division is held in similar regard to the three main terrestrial networks in South Korea.

JTBC was one of four new South Korean nationwide generalist cable TV networks alongside Dong-A Ilbo's Channel A, Chosun Ilbo's TV Chosun and Maeil Kyungje's MBN launch in 2011, to serve as supplementary networks to the existing conventional free-to-air TV networks like KBS, MBC, SBS and other smaller channels launched following deregulation in 1990.

History 

The JoongAng Ilbo, which used to be a part of the Samsung, had owned a TV station before. In 1964 it founded the Tongyang Broadcasting Corporation (TBC) and ran the network for 16 years. In 1980, however TBC was forcibly merged with the state-run KBS by the military regime of Chun Doo-hwan. At its founding in 2011 some media analysts considered the return of JoongAng Ilbo to television in JTBC as the reincarnation of TBC.

Timeline
 26 June 1964: Tongyang Broadcasting Corporation was launched.
 7 December 1964: TBC-TV Started broadcasting on channel 7.
 30 November 1980: TBC-TV merged with KBS Television by the special law of Chun Doo-hwan, president of military authorities, resulting in the launching of KBS 2TV.
 22 July 2009: Amendment of the Media law passed the national assembly to deregulate the media market of South Korea. 
It was a response of the South Korean government to the Chojoongdong (Chosun Ilbo, JoongAng Ilbo, and Dong-A Ilbo), who were the major media conglomerates, aim to launch the cable market. 
 31 December 2010: JTBC, TV Chosun, MBN, Channel A selected as General Cable Television Channel Broadcasters.
 11 March 2011: JoongAng Ilbo established JTBC corporation.
 1 December 2011: JTBC (Joongang Tongyang Broadcasting Company) (Channel number 15) started broadcasting.
 May 2013: Former MBC news anchor Sohn Suk-hee was designated as JTBC's new president for its news division.
 January 2015: JTBC constructs a new building in Digital Media City in Sangam-dong, Seoul.
November 2018: Sohn Suk-hee is promoted to JTBC's president and CEO.
 June 2019: JTBC acquired the Korean rights to the Olympic Games from 2026 to 2032.
April 2020: JTBC moves their newscasts to Creation Hall, starting with JTBC Newsroom, with its other programs following suit on 18 May.
June 2021: JTBC buys a majority stake on wiip from CAA.

Programs

 News programs including JTBC Newsroom, Political Desk, and Sangam-Dong Class
 JTBC dramas hold 9 spots of the 50, including The World of the Married being the highest-rated cable drama on the list of highest-rated Korean dramas in cable television, surpassing JTBC's previous record with SKY Castle.
Cultural productions such as Begin Again and Ssulzun
Variety shows including Knowing Bros, Let's Eat Dinner Together, Traveler, and more.

Drama

Variety

Viewership ratings
 The table below lists the top 10 dramas with the highest average audience share ratings (nationwide), corresponding episode with highest rating and the date.

「Ratings」data sourced from Nielsen Korea nationwide rating of cable channel, with the inclusion of occasional advertisement

Subsidiaries

Award

See also 

 Samsung
 List of Shinhwa Broadcast episodes
 Maeil Broadcasting Network
 TV Chosun

References

External links 
  

 
2011 establishments in South Korea
Broadcasting companies of South Korea
Conservative media in South Korea
Korean-language television stations
Mass media companies of South Korea
Mass media in Seoul
Television channels and stations established in 2011
Television channels in South Korea